Melvin Henry "Hank" Autry (born May 2, 1947) is a former American football player in the American Football League (AFL) and the National Football League (NFL).  He played college football at University of Southern Mississippi, where he was a center.  He played professionally in the AFL for the Houston Oilers in 1969 and the NFL's Oilers in 1970.

See also
List of American Football League players

References

1947 births
Living people
Sportspeople from Hattiesburg, Mississippi
Players of American football from Mississippi
American football centers
Southern Miss Golden Eagles football players
Houston Oilers players
American Football League players